Nina Kraft (31 December 1968 – 17 August 2020) was a German professional triathlete from Braunschweig.

Career
Kraft worked as a drafter until 1998, when she became a full-time professional athlete. In addition to being a pro triathlete Kraft was also an artist. On her website she states that she "uses art to help her switch off and relax."

2004 Ironman World Championship
Following her win at Ironman Germany in July 2004 Kraft crossed the finish line in first place a few months later in October at the Ironman World Championship as the apparent Ironman World Champion. However, a month after being declared the winner, Kraft tested positive for Erythropoietin, better known as EPO. She and her coach, Martin Malleirer, admitted to the decision to take the performance-enhancing drug. As a result, she was stripped of her title and the second-place finisher Natascha Badmann was awarded her fifth Ironman world title.

Kraft was banned by the German Triathlon Federation (DTU), for one year, after a positive drugs test. This ban ended on 12 November 2005. The privately owned World Triathlon Corporation banned Kraft from all Ironman events worldwide until 16 October 2006. As a result of Kraft and Katja Schumacher's doping cases, the DTU created the Elitepass: only Elitepass holders would be eligible for prize money, and they would be subject to unannounced drug testing.

Comeback
After the end of her German ban, she trained in Clermont, Florida. She joined the Braunschweig club Tri-Lions and applied for an Elitepass from the DTU.

On 12 February 2006, she entered her first post-ban race, winning second place at the 15th Triathlon De Santos in Brazil. In August 2006, she won the German championship at the half Iron distance race in Kulmbach with a lead of 12 minutes. In May 2007 she won the Ironman Brazil, and on 3 November of the same year, she won the Florida Ironman with a time of 9 hours 5 minutes and 35 seconds, breaking the course record by 20 minutes.

On 1 February 2009, Kraft won the Tallahassee Marathon with a new course record of 2:45, and she won the Ironman Louisville in 2009, 2011 and 2014, making her the oldest female Ironman gold medalist at the age of 45.

Notable results
 First place
 Ironman Louisville 2014 - (9:31:19)
 Ironman Louisville 2011 - (9:38:14)
 Ironman Louisville 2009 - (9:20:21)
 Ironman Florida 2007 - (9:05:35)
 Ironman Brazil 2007 - (9:12:39)
 Opel Ironman Germany Frankfurt 2004 - (8:58:43)
 Kohler Haardman Oer Erkenschwick 2004 - (3:56:21)
 Half-Ironman St. Croix 2004 - (4:37:01)
 Ironman Germany Frankfurt 2003 - (9:03:11)
 Quelle Challenge Roth 2002 - (9:12:41)
 Ironman Europe Roth 2001 - (9:24:29)
 Ironman South Africa 2001 - (9:33:11)
 Second place
 Ironman Louisville 2007 (9:51:53)
 Ironman Hawaii 2002 - (9:14:23)
 UK Half-Ironman Llanberis 2002 - (4:25:48)
 Ironman Europe Roth 1999 - (9:29:25)
 Neuseeland WM Mitteldistanz 1999 - (4:33:08)
 Third place
 Ironman Hawaii 2003 - (9:17:16)
 Ironman Hawaii 2000 - (9:41:01)
 Fourth place
 Ironman Europe Roth 2000 - (9:40:01)
 Sixth place
 Ironman Neuseeland 1999 - (9:38:51)
 Ironman Europe Roth 1998 - (9:57:44)
 16th place
 Ironman WM Hawaii 1999 - (9:52:37)
 50th place
 Ironman WM Hawaii 1998 - (11:02:47)

Two 2009 marathon wins at Tallahassee (2:45) & Gasparilla (2:47) where Kraft claimed both the masters & overall female titles.

References

External links

1968 births
2020 deaths
Sportspeople from Braunschweig
Doping cases in triathlon
German female triathletes
German sportspeople in doping cases